Leonid Rumyantsev (23 February 1916 – 23 June 1985) was a Soviet footballer. He played for Spartak Moscow between 1935–1940. He was Champion of the USSR in 1936 (j), 1938, 1939, USSR Championship bronze medalist in 1936, 1940, and winner of the USSR Cup in 1938, 1939.

References

1916 births
1985 deaths
FC Spartak Moscow players
Soviet footballers
Soviet Top League players
Association football forwards